Fairhaven is a coastal locality in the Surf Coast Shire, Victoria, Australia. In the 2021 census, Fairhaven had a population of 390 people.

The village is a popular holiday destination, with many homes being used for that purpose. It adjoins Fairhaven Beach, which at 6 km long is the longest beach on the Great Ocean Road. The village is separated from adjoining Aireys Inlet by the Painkalac Creek, and development in recent years has seen Fairhaven become increasingly joined to the Aireys Inlet township.

Fairhaven Beach is a popular surfing destination, and the Fairhaven Surf Lifesaving Club, which was founded in 1957, has been described as Fairhaven's "social centre". The club operated out of a volunteer-built clubhouse from 1960 until 2012, when the building was demolished to allow for the construction of a new modern one. Numerous delays saw the club operating out of shipping containers for more than a year, but a new clubhouse finally opened in December 2013.
The locality was mentioned in the 1991 Hollywood blockbuster “Point Break” during the final portion of the movie on a radio weather warning for a cyclone whose eye was about to cross over the locality during the famed 50 year storm. In reality the area is around 1500 kilometres south of the zone in which a cyclone can form.
A local landmark is the Pole House, situated on a concrete column 40 metres above Fairhaven Beach. The original house, built in 1978, was demolished in 2013 after the owners thwarted a bid to list the building on the Victorian Heritage Register. In 2013–14, a house was rebuilt on the existing pole, to a modern design along similar lines. Better Homes and Gardens filmed a segment there for the opening of the replacement house in early 2014.

The Fairhaven area was badly damaged in the Ash Wednesday bushfires of 1983.

References

Towns in Victoria (Australia)
Surf Coast Shire
Coastal towns in Victoria (Australia)